HellWood is the fourth studio album by Polish heavy metal band Hunter. It was released on April 14, 2009 by Mystic Production.

A music videos have been made for the songs "Labirynt Fauna" and "Strasznik" directed by Dariusz Szermanowicz and Mateusz Winkiel, respectively.

The album landed at number 9 on Polish Albums Chart, and dropped out five weeks later.

Track listing

Credits

References 

2009 albums
Hunter (band) albums
Mystic Production albums
Polish-language albums